Sopor may refer to:

 Sopor (sleep)
 Sopor Aeternus, musical project
 Methaqualone, by the trade name Sopor

See also
 Sopore, a town in Jammu and Kashmir, India